Rennock Lodge is a neighbourhood in Kingston, Jamaica. J.E. Duerden reported finding pre-Columbian art in the area in 1879 in the form of two stone sculpted "images" described as amulets.

Notable people
 Outlaw Dennis Barth attended Rennock Lodge Elementary School and operated his gang from the area
 Oswald Williams, "Count Ossie", had a Rastafarian commune in the area.

References

Neighbourhoods in Kingston, Jamaica